Ecosystem services are the many and varied benefits to humans provided by the natural environment and healthy ecosystems. Such ecosystems include, for example, agroecosystems, forest ecosystem, grassland ecosystems, and aquatic ecosystems. These ecosystems, functioning in healthy relationships, offer such things as natural pollination of crops, clean air, extreme weather mitigation, and human mental and physical well-being. Collectively, these benefits are becoming known as ecosystem services, and are often integral to the provision of food, the provisioning of clean drinking water, the decomposition of wastes, and the resilience and productivity of food ecosystems.

While scientists and environmentalists have discussed ecosystem services implicitly for decades, the Millennium Ecosystem Assessment (MA) in the early 2000s popularized this concept. There, ecosystem services are grouped into four broad categories: provisioning, such as the production of food and water; regulating, such as the control of climate and disease; supporting, such as nutrient cycles and oxygen production; and cultural, such as spiritual and recreational benefits. To help inform decision-makers, many ecosystem services are being evaluated to draw equivalent comparisons to human-engineered infrastructure and services.

Estuarine and coastal ecosystems are both marine ecosystems. Together, these ecosystems perform the four categories of ecosystem services in a variety of ways: "Regulating services" include climate regulation as well as waste treatment and disease regulation and buffer zones. The "provisioning services" include forest products such as timbers, marine products, fresh water, raw materials, and biochemical and genetic resources. "Cultural services" of coastal ecosystems include inspirational aspects, recreation and tourism, science and education. "Supporting services" of coastal ecosystems include nutrient cycling, biologically mediated habitats, and primary production.

Definition
Ecosystem services or eco-services are defined as the goods and services provided by ecosystems to humans.  Per the 2006 Millennium Ecosystem Assessment (MA), ecosystem services are "the benefits people obtain from ecosystems". The MA also delineated the four categories of ecosystem services—supporting, provisioning, regulating, and cultural—discussed below. In simple terms provision of food materials, water, timber, fibers, and the provision of medications.

By 2010, there had evolved various working definitions and descriptions of ecosystem services in the literature. To prevent double-counting in ecosystem services audits, for instance, The Economics of Ecosystems and Biodiversity (TEEB) replaced "Supporting Services" in the MA with "Habitat Services" and "ecosystem functions", defined as "a subset of the interactions between ecosystem structure and processes that underpin the capacity of an ecosystem to provide goods and services".

Categories

Four different types of ecosystem services have been distinguished by the scientific body: regulating services, provisioning services, cultural services and supporting services. An ecosystem does not necessarily offer all four types of services simultaneously; but given the intricate nature of any ecosystem, it is usually assumed that humans benefit from a combination of these services. The services offered by diverse types of ecosystems (forests, seas, coral reefs, mangroves, etc.) differ in nature and in consequence. In fact, some services directly affect the livelihood of neighboring human populations (such as fresh water, food or aesthetic value, etc.) while other services affect general environmental conditions by which humans are indirectly impacted (such as climate change, erosion regulation or natural hazard regulation, etc.).

The Millennium Ecosystem Assessment report 2005 defined ecosystem services as benefits people obtain from ecosystems and distinguishes four categories of ecosystem services, where the so-called supporting services are regarded as the basis for the services of the other three categories.

Regulating services 
 Purification of water and air
 Carbon sequestration and climate regulation
 Waste decomposition and detoxification
 Predation regulates prey populations
 Biological control pest and disease control
 Pollination
 Disturbance regulation, i.e. flood protection

Provisioning services 
The following services are also known as ecosystem goods:
 food (including seafood and game), crops, wild foods, and spices
 raw materials (including lumber, skins, fuelwood, organic matter, fodder, and fertilizer)
 genetic resources (including crop improvement genes, and health care)
 biogenic minerals
 medicinal resources (including pharmaceuticals, chemical models, and test and assay organisms)
 energy (hydropower, biomass fuels)
 ornamental resources (including fashion, handicrafts, jewelry, pets, worship, decoration, and souvenirs like furs, feathers, ivory, orchids, butterflies, aquarium fish, shells, etc.)

Cultural services 
 cultural (including use of nature as motif in books, film, painting, folklore, national symbols, advertising, etc.)
 spiritual and historical (including use of nature for religious or heritage value or natural)
 recreational experiences (including ecotourism, outdoor sports, and recreation)
 science and education (including use of natural systems for school excursions, and scientific discovery)
 therapeutic (including eco-therapy, social forestry and animal assisted therapy)

As of 2012, there was a discussion as to how the concept of cultural ecosystem services could be operationalized, how landscape aesthetics, cultural heritage, outdoor recreation, and spiritual significance to define can fit into the ecosystem services approach. who vote for models that explicitly link ecological structures and functions with cultural values and benefits. Likewise, there has been a fundamental critique of the concept of cultural ecosystem services that builds on three arguments:

 Pivotal cultural values attaching to the natural/cultivated environment rely on an area's unique character that cannot be addressed by methods that use universal scientific parameters to determine ecological structures and functions.
 If a natural/cultivated environment has symbolic meanings and cultural values the object of these values are not ecosystems but shaped phenomena like mountains, lakes, forests, and, mainly, symbolic landscapes.
 Cultural values do result not from properties produced by ecosystems but are the product of a specific way of seeing within the given cultural framework of symbolic experience.

The Common International Classification of Ecosystem Services (CICES) is a classification scheme developed to accounting systems (like National counts etc.), in order to avoid double-counting of Supporting Services with others Provisioning and Regulating Services.

Supporting services 
These may be redundant with regulating services in some categorisations, but include services such as, but not limited to, nutrient cycling, primary production, soil formation, habitat provision. These services make it possible for the ecosystems to continue providing services such as food supply, flood regulation, and water purification.  Slade et al. outline the situation where a greater number of species would maximize more ecosystem services

Ecology
Understanding of ecosystem services requires a strong foundation in ecology, which describes the underlying principles and interactions of organisms and the environment. Since the scales at which these entities interact can vary from microbes to landscapes, milliseconds to millions of years, one of the greatest remaining challenges is the descriptive characterization of energy and material flow between them.  For example, the area of a forest floor, the detritus upon it, the micro organisms in the soil, the soil biodiversity, and characteristics of the soil itself will all contribute to the abilities of that forest for providing ecosystem services like carbon sequestration, water purification, and erosion prevention to other areas within the watershed. Note that it is often possible for multiple services to be bundled together and when benefits of targeted objectives are secured, there may also be ancillary benefits—the same forest may provide habitat for other organisms as well as human recreation, which are also ecosystem services.

The complexity of Earth's ecosystems poses a challenge for scientists as they try to understand how relationships are interwoven among organisms, processes and their surroundings. As it relates to human ecology, a suggested research agenda for the study of ecosystem services includes the following steps:
 identification of ecosystem service providers (ESPs)—species or populations that provide specific ecosystem services—and characterization of their functional roles and relationships;
 determination of community structure aspects that influence how ESPs function in their natural landscape, such as compensatory responses that stabilize function and non-random extinction sequences which can erode it;
 assessment of key environmental (abiotic) factors influencing the provision of services;
 measurement of the spatial and temporal scales ESPs and their services operate on.

Recently, a technique has been developed to improve and standardize the evaluation of ESP functionality by quantifying the relative importance of different species in terms of their efficiency and abundance. Such parameters provide indications of how species respond to changes in the environment (i.e. predators, resource availability, climate) and are useful for identifying species that are disproportionately important at providing ecosystem services. However, a critical drawback is that the technique does not account for the effects of interactions, which are often both complex and fundamental in maintaining an ecosystem and can involve species that are not readily detected as a priority. Even so, estimating the functional structure of an ecosystem and combining it with information about individual species traits can help us understand the resilience of an ecosystem amidst environmental change.

Many ecologists also believe that the provision of ecosystem services can be stabilized with biodiversity. Increasing biodiversity also benefits the variety of ecosystem services available to society. Understanding the relationship between biodiversity and an ecosystem's stability is essential to the management of natural resources and their services.

Redundancy hypothesis
The concept of ecological redundancy is sometimes referred to as functional compensation and assumes that more than one species performs a given role within an ecosystem.  More specifically, it is characterized by a particular species increasing its efficiency at providing a service when conditions are stressed in order to maintain aggregate stability in the ecosystem. However, such increased dependence on a compensating species places additional stress on the ecosystem and often enhances its susceptibility to subsequent disturbance. The redundancy hypothesis can be summarized as "species redundancy enhances ecosystem resilience".

Another idea uses the analogy of rivets in an airplane wing to compare the exponential effect the loss of each species will have on the function of an ecosystem; this is sometimes referred to as rivet popping. If only one species disappears, the loss of the ecosystem's efficiency as a whole is relatively small; however, if several species are lost, the system essentially collapses—similar to an airplane that has lost too many rivets. The hypothesis assumes that species are relatively specialized in their roles and that their ability to compensate for one another is less than in the redundancy hypothesis. As a result, the loss of any species is critical to the performance of the ecosystem. The key difference is the rate at which the loss of species affects total ecosystem functioning.

Portfolio effect
A third explanation, known as the portfolio effect, compares biodiversity to stock holdings, where diversification minimizes the volatility of the investment, or in this case, the risk of instability of ecosystem services. This is related to the idea of response diversity where a suite of species will exhibit differential responses to a given environmental perturbation. When considered together, they create a stabilizing function that preserves the integrity of a service.

Several experiments have tested these hypotheses in both the field and the lab. In ECOTRON, a laboratory in the UK where many of the biotic and abiotic factors of nature can be simulated, studies have focused on the effects of earthworms and symbiotic bacteria on plant roots. These laboratory experiments seem to favor the rivet hypothesis. However, a study on grasslands at Cedar Creek Reserve in Minnesota supports the redundancy hypothesis, as have many other field studies. See also: Biodiversity#Ecosystem services.

Estuarine and coastal ecosystem services

Estuarine and marine coastal ecosystems are both marine ecosystems. Together, these ecosystems perform the four categories of ecosystem services in a variety of ways: "Regulating services" include climate regulation as well as waste treatment and disease regulation and buffer zones. The "provisioning services" include forest products, marine products, fresh water, raw materials, biochemical and genetic resources. "Cultural services" of coastal ecosystems include inspirational aspects, recreation and tourism, science and education. "Supporting services" of coastal ecosystems include nutrient cycling, biologically mediated habitats and primary production.

Coasts and their adjacent areas on and offshore are an important part of a local ecosystem. The mixture of fresh water and salt water (brackish water) in estuaries provides many nutrients for marine life. Salt marshes, mangroves and beaches also support a diversity of plants, animals and insects crucial to the food chain. The high level of biodiversity creates a high level of biological activity, which has attracted human activity for thousands of years. Coasts also create essential material for organisms to live by, including estuaries, wetland, seagrass, coral reefs, and mangroves. Coasts provide habitats for migratory birds, sea turtles, marine mammals, and coral reefs.

Regulating services
Regulating services are the "benefits obtained from the regulation of ecosystem processes". In the case of coastal and estuarine ecosystems, these services include climate regulation, waste treatment and disease control and natural hazard regulation.

Climate regulation
Both the biotic and abiotic ensembles of marine ecosystems play a role in climate regulation. They act as sponges when it comes to gases in the atmosphere, retaining large levels of CO2 and other greenhouse gases (methane and nitrous oxide). Marine plants also use CO2 for photosynthesis purposes and help in reducing the atmospheric CO2. The oceans and seas absorb the heat from the atmosphere and redistribute it through the means of water currents, and atmospheric processes, such as evaporation and the reflection of light allow for the cooling and warming of the overlying atmosphere. The ocean temperatures are thus imperative to the regulation of the atmospheric temperatures in any part of the world: "without the ocean, the Earth would be unbearably hot during the daylight hours and frigidly cold, if not frozen, at night".

Waste treatment and disease regulation
Another service offered by marine ecosystem is the treatment of wastes, thus helping in the regulation of diseases. Wastes can be diluted and detoxified through transport across marine ecosystems; pollutants are removed from the environment and stored, buried or recycled in marine ecosystems: "Marine ecosystems break down organic waste through microbial communities that filter water, reduce/limit the effects of eutrophication, and break down toxic hydrocarbons into their basic components such as carbon dioxide, nitrogen, phosphorus, and water". The fact that waste is diluted with large volumes of water and moves with water currents leads to the regulation of diseases and the reduction of toxics in seafood.

Buffer zones

Coastal and estuarine ecosystems act as buffer zones against natural hazards and environmental disturbances, such as floods, cyclones, tidal surges and storms. The role they play is to "[absorb] a portion of the impact and thus [lessen] its effect on the land". Wetlands (which include saltwater swamps, salt marshes, ...) and the vegetation it supports – trees, root mats, etc. – retain large amounts of water (surface water, snowmelt, rain, groundwater) and then slowly releases them back, decreasing the likeliness of floods. Mangrove forests protect coastal shorelines from tidal erosion or erosion by currents; a process that was studied after the 1999 cyclone that hit India. Villages that were surrounded with mangrove forests encountered less damages than other villages that weren't protected by mangroves.

Provisioning services
Provisioning services consist of all "the products obtained from ecosystems".

Forest products 
Forests produce a large type and variety of timber products, including roundwood, sawnwood, panels, and engineered wood, e.g., cross-laminated timber, as well as pulp and paper. Besides the production of timber, forestry activities may also result in products that undergo little processing, such as fire wood, charcoal, wood chips and roundwood used in an unprocessed form. Global production and trade of all major wood-based products recorded their highest ever values in 2018. Production, imports and exports of roundwood, sawnwood, wood-based panels, wood pulp, wood charcoal and pellets reached their maximum quantities since 1947 when FAO started reporting global forest product statistics. In 2018, growth in production of the main wood-based product groups ranged from 1 percent (woodbased panels) to 5 percent (industrial roundwood). The fastest growth occurred in the Asia-Pacific, Northern American and European regions, likely due to positive economic growth in these areas.

Forests also provide non-wood forest products, including fodder, aromatic and medicinal plants, and wild foods.Worldwide, around 1 billion people depend to some extent on wild foods such as wild meat, edible insects, edible plant products, mushrooms and fish, which often contain high levels of key micronutrients. The value of forest foods as a nutritional resource is not limited to low- and middle-income countries; more than 100 million people in the European Union (EU) regularly consume wild food. Some 2.4 billion people – in both urban and rural settings – use wood-based energy for cooking.

Marine products
Marine ecosystems provide people with: wild & cultured seafood, fresh water, fiber & fuel and biochemical & genetic resources.

Humans consume a large number of products originating from the seas, whether as a nutritious product or for use in other sectors: "More than one billion people worldwide, or one-sixth of the global population, rely on fish as their main source of animal protein. In 2000, marine and coastal fisheries accounted for 12 per cent of world food production". Fish and other edible marine products – primarily fish, shellfish, roe and seaweeds – constitute for populations living along the coast the main elements of the local cultural diets, norms and traditions. A very pertinent example would be sushi, the national food of Japan, which consists mostly of different types of fish and seaweed.

Fresh water
Water bodies that are not highly concentrated in salts are referred to as 'fresh water' bodies. Fresh water may run through lakes, rivers and streams, to name a few; but it is most prominently found in the frozen state or as soil moisture or buried deep underground. Fresh water is not only important for the survival of humans, but also for the survival of all the existing species of animals, plants.

Raw materials
Marine creatures provide us with the raw materials needed for the manufacturing of clothing, building materials (lime extracted from coral reefs), ornamental items and personal-use items (luffas, art and jewelry): "The skin of marine mammals for clothing, gas deposits for energy production, lime (extracted from coral reefs) for building construction, and the timber of mangroves and coastal forests for shelter are some of the more familiar uses of marine organisms. Raw marine materials are utilized for non-essential goods as well, such as shells and corals in ornamental items". Humans have also referred to processes within marine environments for the production of renewable energy: using the power of waves – or tidal power – as a source of energy for the powering of a turbine, for example. Oceans and seas are used as sites for offshore oil and gas installations, offshore wind farms.

Biochemical and genetic resources
Biochemical resources are compounds extracted from marine organisms for use in medicines, pharmaceuticals, cosmetics, and other biochemical products. Genetic resources are the genetic information found in marine organisms that would later on be used for animal and plant breeding and for technological advances in the biological field. These resources are either directly taken out from an organism – such as fish oil as a source of omega3 –, or used as a model for innovative man-made products: "such as the construction of fiber optics technology based on the properties of sponges. ... Compared to terrestrial products, marine-sourced products tend to be more highly bioactive, likely due to the fact that marine organisms have to retain their potency despite being diluted in the surrounding sea-water".

Cultural services
Cultural services relate to the non-material world, as they benefit the benefit recreational, aesthetic, cognitive and spiritual activities, which are not easily quantifiable in monetary terms.

Inspirational
Marine environments have been used by many as an inspiration for their works of art, music, architecture, traditions... Water environments are spiritually important as a lot of people view them as a means for rejuvenation and change of perspective. Many also consider the water as being a part of their personality, especially if they have lived near it since they were kids: they associate it to fond memories and past experiences. Living near water bodies for a long time results in a certain set of water activities that become a ritual in the lives of people and of the culture in the region.

Recreation and tourism
Sea sports are very popular among coastal populations: surfing, snorkeling, whale watching, kayaking, recreational fishing ... a lot of tourists also travel to resorts close to the sea or rivers or lakes to be able to experience these activities, and relax near the water. The United Nations Sustainable Development Goal 14 also has targets aimed at enhancing the use of ecosystem services for sustainable tourism especially in Small Island Developing States.

Science and education
A lot can be learned from marine processes, environments and organisms – that could be implemented into our daily actions and into the scientific domain. Although much is still yet to still be known about the ocean world: "by the extraordinary intricacy and complexity of the marine environment and how it is influenced by large spatial scales, time lags, and cumulative effects".

Supporting services
Supporting services are the services that allow for the other ecosystem services to be present. They have indirect impacts on humans that last over a long period of time. Several services can be considered as being both supporting services and regulating/cultural/provisioning services.

Nutrient cycling
Nutrient cycling is the movement of nutrients through an ecosystem by biotic and abiotic processes. The ocean is a vast storage pool for these nutrients, such as carbon, nitrogen and phosphorus. The nutrients are absorbed by the basic organisms of the marine food web and are thus transferred from one organism to the other and from one ecosystem to the other. Nutrients are recycled through the life cycle of organisms as they die and decompose, releasing the nutrients into the neighboring environment. "The service of nutrient cycling eventually impacts all other ecosystem services as all living things require a constant supply of nutrients to survive".

Biologically mediated habitats
Biologically mediated habitats are defined as being the habitats that living marine structures offer to other organisms. These need not to have evolved for the sole purpose of serving as a habitat, but happen to become living quarters whilst growing naturally. For example, coral reefs and mangrove forests are home to numerous species of fish, seaweed and shellfish ... The importance of these habitats is that they allow for interactions between different species, aiding the provisioning of marine goods and services. They are also very important for the growth at the early life stages of marine species (breeding and bursary spaces), as they serve as a food source and as a shelter from predators.

Primary production
Primary production refers to the production of organic matter, i.e., chemically bound energy, through processes such as photosynthesis and chemosynthesis. The organic matter produced by primary producers forms the basis of all food webs. Further, it generates oxygen (O2), a molecule necessary to sustain animals and humans. On average, a human consumes about 550 liter of oxygen per day, whereas plants produce 1,5 liter of oxygen per 10 grams of growth.

Economics 

There are questions regarding the environmental and economic values of ecosystem services. Some people may be unaware of the environment in general and humanity's interrelatedness with the natural environment, which may cause misconceptions. Although environmental awareness is rapidly improving in our contemporary world, ecosystem capital and its flow are still poorly understood, threats continue to impose, and we suffer from the so-called 'tragedy of the commons'. Many efforts to inform decision-makers of current versus future costs and benefits now involve organizing and translating scientific knowledge to economics, which articulate the consequences of our choices in comparable units of impact on human well-being. An especially challenging aspect of this process is that interpreting ecological information collected from one spatial-temporal scale does not necessarily mean it can be applied at another; understanding the dynamics of ecological processes relative to ecosystem services is essential in aiding economic decisions. Weighting factors such as a service's irreplaceability or bundled services can also allocate economic value such that goal attainment becomes more efficient.

The economic valuation of ecosystem services also involves social communication and information, areas that remain particularly challenging and are the focus of many researchers. In general, the idea is that although individuals make decisions for any variety of reasons, trends reveal the aggregated preferences of a society, from which the economic value of services can be inferred and assigned. The six major methods for valuing ecosystem services in monetary terms are:
 Avoided cost: Services allow society to avoid costs that would have been incurred in the absence of those services (e.g. waste treatment by wetland habitats avoids health costs)
 Replacement cost: Services could be replaced with man-made systems (e.g. restoration of the Catskill Watershed cost less than the construction of a water purification plant)
 Factor income: Services provide for the enhancement of incomes (e.g. improved water quality increases the commercial take of a fishery and improves the income of fishers)
 Travel cost: Service demand may require travel, whose costs can reflect the implied value of the service (e.g. value of ecotourism experience is at least what a visitor is willing to pay to get there)
 Hedonic pricing: Service demand may be reflected in the prices people will pay for associated goods (e.g. coastal housing prices exceed that of inland homes)
 Contingent valuation: Service demand may be elicited by posing hypothetical scenarios that involve some valuation of alternatives (e.g. visitors willing to pay for increased access to national parks)

A peer-reviewed study published in 1997 estimated the value of the world's ecosystem services and natural capital to be between US$16 and $54 trillion per year, with an average of US$33 trillion per year. However, Salles (2011) indicated 'The total value of biodiversity is infinite, so having debate about what is the total value of nature is actually pointless because we can't live without it'.

As of 2012, many companies were not fully aware of the extent of their dependence and impact on ecosystems and the possible ramifications. Likewise, environmental management systems and environmental due diligence tools are more suited to handle "traditional" issues of pollution and natural resource consumption. Most focus on environmental impacts, not dependence. Several tools and methodologies can help the private sector value and assess ecosystem services, including Our Ecosystem, the 2008 Corporate Ecosystem Services Review, the Artificial Intelligence for Environment & Sustainability (ARIES) project from 2007, the Natural Value Initiative (2012) and InVEST (Integrated Valuation of Ecosystem Services & Tradeoffs, 2012)

Payments

Management and policy 

Although monetary pricing continues with respect to the valuation of ecosystem services, the challenges in policy implementation and management are significant and considerable. The administration of common pool resources has been a subject of extensive academic pursuit. From defining the problems to finding solutions that can be applied in practical and sustainable ways, there is much to overcome. Considering options must balance present and future human needs, and decision-makers must frequently work from valid but incomplete information. Existing legal policies are often considered insufficient since they typically pertain to human health-based standards that are mismatched with necessary means to protect ecosystem health and services. In 2000, to improve the information available, the implementation of an Ecosystem Services Framework has been suggested (ESF), which integrates the biophysical and socio-economic dimensions of protecting the environment and is designed to guide institutions through multidisciplinary information and jargon, helping to direct strategic choices.

As of 2005 Local to regional collective management efforts were considered appropriate for services like crop pollination or resources like water. Another approach that has become increasingly popular during the 1990s is the marketing of ecosystem services protection. Payment and trading of services is an emerging worldwide small-scale solution where one can acquire credits for activities such as sponsoring the protection of carbon sequestration sources or the restoration of ecosystem service providers. In some cases, banks for handling such credits have been established and conservation companies have even gone public on stock exchanges, defining an evermore parallel link with economic endeavors and opportunities for tying into social perceptions. However, crucial for implementation are clearly defined land rights, which are often lacking in many developing countries. In particular, many forest-rich developing countries suffering deforestation experience conflict between different forest stakeholders. In addition, concerns for such global transactions include inconsistent compensation for services or resources sacrificed elsewhere and misconceived warrants for irresponsible use. As of 2001, another approach focused on protecting ecosystem service biodiversity hotspots. Recognition that the conservation of many ecosystem services aligns with more traditional conservation goals (i.e. biodiversity) has led to the suggested merging of objectives for maximizing their mutual success. This may be particularly strategic when employing networks that permit the flow of services across landscapes, and might also facilitate securing the financial means to protect services through a diversification of investors.

For example, as of 2013, there had been interest in the valuation of ecosystem services provided by shellfish production and restoration. A keystone species, low in the food chain, bivalve shellfish such as oysters support a complex community of species by performing a number of functions essential to the diverse array of species that surround them. There is also increasing recognition that some shellfish species may impact or control many ecological processes; so much so that they are included on the list of "ecosystem engineers"—organisms that physically, biologically or chemically modify the environment around them in ways that influence the health of other organisms. Many of the ecological functions and processes performed or affected by shellfish contribute to human well-being by providing a stream of valuable ecosystem services over time by filtering out particulate materials and potentially mitigating water quality issues by controlling excess nutrients in the water.
As of 2018, the concept of ecosystem services had not been properly implemented into international and regional legislation yet.

Notwithstanding, the United Nations Sustainable Development Goal 15 has a target to ensure the conservation, restoration, and sustainable use of ecosystem services.

Ecosystem-based adaptation (EbA)

Ecosystem-based adaptation or EbA is a strategy for community development and environmental management that seeks to use an ecosystem services framework to help communities adapt to the effects of climate change. The Convention on Biological Diversity defines it as "the use of biodiversity and ecosystem services to help people adapt to the adverse effects of climate change", which includes the use of "sustainable management, conservation and restoration of ecosystems, as part of an overall adaptation strategy that takes into account the multiple social, economic and cultural co-benefits for local communities".

In 2001, the Millennium Ecosystem Assessment announced that humanity's impact on the natural world was increasing to levels never before seen, and that the degradation of the planet's ecosystems would become a major barrier to achieving the Millennium Development Goals. In recognition of this fact, Ecosystem-Based Adaptation sought to use the restoration of ecosystems as a stepping-stone to improve the quality of life in communities experiencing the impacts of climate change. Specifically, it involved the restoration of such ecosystems that provide food and water and protection from storm surges and flooding. EbA interventions combine elements of both climate change mitigation and adaptation to global warming to help address the community's current and future needs.

Collaborative planning between scientists, policy makers, and community members is an essential element of Ecosystem-Based Adaptation. By drawing on the expertise of outside experts and local residents alike, EbA seeks to develop unique solutions to unique problems, rather than simply replicating past projects.

Land use change decisions 

Ecosystem services decisions require making complex choices at the intersection of ecology, technology, society, and the economy. The process of making ecosystem services decisions must consider the interaction of many types of information, honor all stakeholder viewpoints, including regulatory agencies, proposal proponents, decision makers, residents, NGOs, and measure the impacts on all four parts of the intersection. These decisions are usually spatial, always multi-objective, and based on uncertain data, models, and estimates. Often it is the combination of the best science combined with the stakeholder values, estimates and opinions that drive the process.

One analytical study modeled the stakeholders as agents to support water resource management decisions in the Middle Rio Grande basin of New Mexico.  This study focused on modeling the stakeholder inputs across a spatial decision, but ignored uncertainty. Another study used Monte Carlo methods to exercise econometric models of landowner decisions in a study of the effects of land-use change.  Here the stakeholder inputs were modeled as random effects to reflect the uncertainty. A third study used a Bayesian decision support system to both model the uncertainty in the scientific information Bayes Nets and to assist collecting and fusing the input from stakeholders.  This study was about siting wave energy devices off the Oregon Coast, but presents a general method for managing uncertain spatial science and stakeholder information in a decision making environment. Remote sensing data and analyses can be used to assess the health and extent of land cover classes that provide ecosystem services, which aids in planning, management, monitoring of stakeholders' actions, and communication between stakeholders.

In Baltic countries scientists, nature conservationists and local authorities are implementing integrated planning approach for grassland ecosystems. They are developing an integrated planning tool based on GIS (geographic information system) technology and put online that will help for planners to choose the best grassland management solution for concrete grassland. It will look holistically at the processes in the countryside and help to find best grassland management solutions by taking into account both natural and socioeconomic factors of the particular site.

History 
While the notion of human dependence on Earth's ecosystems reaches to the start of Homo sapiens existence, the term 'natural capital' was first coined by E. F. Schumacher in 1973 in his book Small is Beautiful.  Recognition of how ecosystems could provide complex services to humankind date back to at least Plato (c. 400 BC) who understood that deforestation could lead to soil erosion and the drying of springs.  Modern ideas of ecosystem services probably began when Marsh challenged in 1864 the idea that Earth's natural resources are unbounded by pointing out changes in soil fertility in the Mediterranean. It was not until the late 1940s that three key authors—Henry Fairfield Osborn, Jr, William Vogt, and Aldo Leopold—promoted recognition of human dependence on the environment.

In 1956, Paul Sears drew attention to the critical role of the ecosystem in processing wastes and recycling nutrients. In 1970, Paul Ehrlich and Rosa Weigert called attention to "ecological systems" in their environmental science textbook and "the most subtle and dangerous threat to man's existence ... the potential destruction, by man's own activities, of those ecological systems upon which the very existence of the human species depends".

The term "environmental services" was introduced in a 1970 report of the Study of Critical Environmental Problems, which listed services including insect pollination, fisheries, climate regulation and flood control. In following years, variations of the term were used, but eventually 'ecosystem services' became the standard in scientific literature.

The ecosystem services concept has continued to expand and includes socio-economic and conservation objectives, which are discussed below. A history of the concepts and terminology of ecosystem services as of 1997, can be found in Daily's book "Nature's Services: Societal Dependence on Natural Ecosystems".

While Gretchen Daily's original definition distinguished between ecosystem goods and ecosystem services, Robert Costanza and colleagues' later work and that of the Millennium Ecosystem Assessment lumped all of these together as ecosystem services.

Examples 
The following examples illustrate the relationships between humans and natural ecosystems through the services derived from them:
 The US military has funded research through the Pacific Northwest National Laboratory, which claims that Department of Defense lands and military installations provide substantial ecosystem services to local communities, including benefits to carbon storage, resiliency to climate, and endangered species habitat. As of 2020, research from Duke University claims for example Eglin Air Force Base provides about $110 million in ecosystem services per year, $40 million more than if no base was present.
 In New York City, where the quality of drinking water had fallen below standards required by the U.S. Environmental Protection Agency (EPA), authorities opted to restore the polluted Catskill Watershed that had previously provided the city with the ecosystem service of water purification. Once the input of sewage and pesticides to the watershed area was reduced, natural abiotic processes such as soil absorption and filtration of chemicals, together with biotic recycling via root systems and soil microorganisms, water quality improved to levels that met government standards. The cost of this investment in natural capital was estimated at $1–1.5 billion, which contrasted dramatically with the estimated $6–8 billion cost of constructing a water filtration plant plus the $300 million annual running costs.
 Pollination of crops by bees is required for 15–30% of U.S. food production; most large-scale farmers import non-native honey bees to provide this service. A 2005 study reported that in California's agricultural region, it was found that wild bees alone could provide partial or complete pollination services or enhance the services provided by honey bees through behavioral interactions. However, intensified agricultural practices can quickly erode pollination services through the loss of species. The remaining species are unable to compensate this. The results of this study also indicate that the proportion of chaparral and oak-woodland habitat available for wild bees within 1–2 km of a farm can stabilize and enhance the provision of pollination services. The presence of such ecosystem elements functions almost like an insurance policy for farmers.
 In watersheds of the Yangtze River in China, spatial models for water flow through different forest habitats were created to determine potential contributions for hydroelectric power in the region. By quantifying the relative value of ecological parameters (vegetation-soil-slope complexes), researchers were able to estimate the annual economic benefit of maintaining forests in the watershed for power services to be 2.2 times that if it were harvested once for timber.
 In the 1980s, mineral water company Vittel (now a brand of Nestlé Waters) faced the problem that nitrate and pesticides were entering the company's springs in northeastern France. Local farmers had intensified agricultural practices and cleared native vegetation that previously had filtered water before it seeped into the aquifer used by Vittel. This contamination threatened the company's right to use the "natural mineral water" label under French law. In response to this business risk, Vittel developed an incentive package for farmers to improve their agricultural practices and consequently reduce water pollution that had affected Vittel's product. For example, Vittel provided subsidies and free technical assistance to farmers in exchange for farmers' agreement to enhance pasture management, reforest catchments, and reduce the use of agrochemicals, an example of a payment for ecosystem services program.
 In 2016, it was counted that to plant 15 000 ha new woodland in the UK, considering only the value of timber, it would cost £79 000 000, which is more than the benefit of £65 000 000. If, however, all other benefits the trees in lowland could provide (like soil stabilization, wind deflection, recreation, food production, air purification, carbon storage, wildlife habitat, fuel production, cooling, flood prevention) were included, the costs will increase due to displacing the profitable farmland (would be around £231 000 000) but would be overweight by benefits of £546 000 000.
 In Europe, various projects are implemented in order to define the values of concrete ecosystems and to implement this concept into decision-making process. For example,  "LIFE Viva grass" project aims to do this with grasslands in Baltics.

See also 

 Blue carbon
 Biodiversity banking
 Flood control by beavers
 Controlled Ecological Life Support System
 Diversity-function debate
 Earth Economics
 Ecological goods and services
 Ecosystem-based disaster risk reduction
 Environmental finance
 Existence value
 Forest farming
 Environmental and economic benefits of having indigenous peoples tend land
 Intergovernmental Science-Policy Platform on Biodiversity and Ecosystem Services
 Keystone species: i.e. wildfire risk reduction by grazers, ...
 Loess Plateau Watershed Rehabilitation Project
 Mitigation banking
 Natural Capital
 Non-timber forest product
 Oxygen cycle
 Panama Canal Watershed
 Rangeland Management
 Soil functions
 Spaceship Earth
 Nature Based Solutions

Sources

References

Further reading

External links
 Millennium Ecosystem Assessment
  Earth Economics
 Gund Institute for Ecological Economics
 The Economics of Ecosystems and Biodiversity
 COHAB Initiative on Health and Biodiversity – Ecosystems and Human Well-being
 The ARIES Project
  Ecosystem Marketplace
 Plan Vivo: an operational model for Payments for Ecosystem Services
 Ecosystem services at Green Facts
 Water Evaluation And Planning (WEAP) system for modeling impacts on aquatic ecosystem services
 Project Life+ Making Good Natura
 GecoServ – Gulf of Mexico Ecosystem Services Valuation Database (includes studies from all over the world, but only coastal ecosystems relevant to the Gulf of Mexico)
 Ecosystem services in environmental accounting

Regional
 Ecosystem Services at the US Forest Service
 GecoServ – Gulf of Mexico Ecosystem Services Valuation Database
 LIFE VIVA Grass – grassland ecosystems services in Baltic countries (assessment and integrated planning)

Ecological restoration
Ecological economics
Systems ecology
Social ecology
Human ecology
Forestry and the environment
Environmental social science concepts